Klimovo is a rural locality (a selo) in Kovarditskoye Rural Settlement, Muromsky District, Vladimir Oblast, Russia. The population was 42 as of 2010.

Geography 
Klimovo is located 33 km northwest of Murom (the district's administrative centre) by road. Selishchi is the nearest rural locality.

References 

Rural localities in Muromsky District
Muromsky Uyezd